Re Daniel Dawal Migel 3 is a 2004 Sri Lankan Sinhala comedy, action film directed by Roy de Silva and produced by Soma Edirisinghe for E.A.P Films. It is the third and final film of Re Daniel Dawal Migel film franchise and sequel to 2000 Re Daniel Dawal Migel 2 film. The comic duo Bandu Samarasinghe, and Tennyson Cooray reprised lead roles along with Dilhani Ekanayake, Jayantha Bopearachchi and Sanoja Bibile. Music for the film is done by Somapala Rathnayake. The film also became one of Sri Lanka's blockbuster hit in cinema theatres, but failure when comparing first two installments. It is the 1031st Sri Lankan film in the Sinhala cinema.

Plot
Daniyel and Migel started to looking for a new life and citing them as 007 and 008. The two started to help people by listening their problems. The two has a new friend Pin Pon (Rajitha) who is the broker of all these problems. Silva (Jayantha) and his friend (Damayantha) settled in Lathara's house and Silva fall in love with Lathara's daughter (Dilhani). But Lathara does not like him and asked him to bring 2 lakhs and be a rich man and then he will decide to marry them. Meanwhile, Victor (Ananda) is looking for his wife Moreen's (Sanoja) death to acquire her millions of properties and marry a new girl. Victor asked 007 and 008 to kill his wife and he'll pay for it. The two tried many ways to kill her but no one had ever success. Silva is also looking to kidnap rich Moreen and ask money from Victor. However, with the help of Daniyel and Migel, Moreen has been kidnapped and explained her husband's secret life. Moreen was very disappointed and ask Daniyel and Migel to punish him. Finally after series of incidents, Victor was captured by a fake death of Moreen, which was a drama to capture him and find money. Victor was jailed, Daniyel and Migel got money, whereas Lathara accepted Silva as his son-in-law.

Cast
 Bandu Samarasinghe as 007 Daniyel 
 Tennyson Cooray as 008 Migel
 Dilhani Ekanayake as Laethara's daughter
 Jayantha Bopearachchi as Silva
 Gemunu Wijesuriya as Uncle Laethara
 Sanoja Bibile as Moreen
 Rajitha Hiran as Pin Pon 000
 Nilanthi Diaz
 Ananda Wickramage as Victor
 Teddy Widyalankara
 Damayantha Perera as Silva's friend
 Upali Keerthisena as Mudalali
 Sumana Amarasinghe

Soundtrack

References

External links
 

2004 films
2000s Sinhala-language films
Films set in Sri Lanka (1948–present)